The year 1580 in science and technology included many events, some of which are listed here.

Astronomy
 The Constantinople Observatory of Taqi ad-Din is destroyed by Sultan Selim II.

Exploration
 September 26 – Francis Drake in the Golden Hind sails into Plymouth having completed the second circumnavigation of the world, westabout, begun in 1577.

Medicine
 Severe outbreak of smallpox in Venezuela: it strikes the Caracas and other Indians in the North and greatly weakens Indian resistance to the Spanish colonizing of the region.

Geology
 April 6 – Dover Straits earthquake.

Births
 January 12 – Jan Baptist van Helmont, Flemish chemist (died 1644)
 December 1 – Nicolas-Claude Fabri de Peiresc, French astronomer (died 1637)
 Peter Crüger, German polymath (died 1639)
 Willebrord Snellius, Dutch mathematician and physicist who devised the basic law of refraction, Snell's law (died 1626)

Deaths
 May 3 – Thomas Tusser, English chorister and agriculturalist (born c. 1524)
 September 15 – Friedrich Risner, German mathematician (born c. 1533)
 Giovanni Filippo Ingrassia, Sicilian anatomist (born 1510).

References

 
16th century in science
1580s in science